Al-Nassr won the championship for the 4th time in 1989, keeping the title in the city of Riyadh.

Hajer and  Al-Rawdhah  entered the top flight, but like most other clubs in their position season's before, went straight back down.

Stadia and locations

Final league table

Al-Riyadh and Al-Raed were promoted.

External links 
 RSSSF Stats
 Saudi Arabia Football Federation
 Saudi League Statistics

Saudi Premier League seasons
Saudi Professional League
Professional League